Maria Jose de la Fuente Parada (born 2 December 1988 ) is a Bolivian female artistic gymnast, representing her nation at international competitions.  

She participated at the 2004 Summer Olympics. and the 2003 World Artistic Gymnastics Championships.

References

External links
 Maria JosÃ© de la Fuente Bio, Stats, and Results
 

1988 births
Living people
Bolivian female artistic gymnasts
Place of birth missing (living people)
Gymnasts at the 2004 Summer Olympics
Olympic gymnasts of Bolivia